Monogramma may refer to:
 Monogramma (alga), a genus of algae in the class Bacillariophyceae, order unknown
 Monogramma (plant), a genus of plants in the family Pteridaceae